Sornnarai Chamrurai (born 7 March 1991), simply known as Max, is a professional footballer from Thailand. He currently plays for Lampang in the Thai League 2 as a goalkeeper.

References

External links
 Profile at Goal

1991 births
Living people
Sornnarai Chamrurai
Sornnarai Chamrurai
Association football goalkeepers
Sornnarai Chamrurai
Sornnarai Chamrurai
Sornnarai Chamrurai
Sornnarai Chamrurai